Tierra Del Sol Preserve is a 180-acre area of protected land one mile west of Land o' Lakes Boulevard (US 41) and two miles south of State Road 52 at 9855 Asbel Road in Land o' Lakes, Florida. It is closed for restoration at present. It was acquired in 2010 to protect a section of the Five Mile Creek wildlife corridor. As of 2013 wetlands in the preserve were being restored and enhanced.

References

External links
Location map

2010 establishments in Florida
Protected areas established in 2010
Protected areas of Pasco County, Florida
Nature reserves in Florida